Alexandru Todea (5 June 1912, Teleac, Mureș County–22 May 2002, Târgu Mureș) was a Romanian Greek-Catholic bishop of the Alba Iulia Diocese and later cardinal. He was also a victim of the communist regime, suffering at Jilava, Sighet, and Pitești prisons.

Born into a peasant family, Todea was the 13th of 16 children. After attending primary school in his native village, and high school in Reghin and Blaj,  Metropolitan bishop Vasile Suciu send him to pursue his theological studies in Rome. He received his doctorate from the Pontificio Collegio Urbano de Propaganda Fide and returned to Romania in 1940. He was consecrated Cardinal-Priest on 28 June 1991 and given the titular church of Sant'Atanasio a Via Tiburtina.

Todea is buried at the Cathedral of the Holy Trinity in Blaj.

References

  Valentin Borda and Mircea Borda, Alexandru Todea: protopop, episcop, mitropolit, cardinal în Biserica Română Unită cu Roma, Greco-Catolică, Târgu-Mureș: Casa de editură Petru Maior, 1999.  
 Silvestru Augustin Prunduș and Clemente Plăianu, Cardinalul Dr. Alexandru Todea: la 80 de ani (1912-1992), Ordinul Sfînful Vasile cel Mare, Provincia "Sf. Apostoli Petru si Pavel", 1992.  
 Silvestru Augustin Prunduș and Clemente Plăianu, Catolicism și Ortodoxie Românească – scurt istoric al Bisericii Române Unite, Cluj-Napoca: Casa de Editură Viața Creștină, 1994.

1912 births
2002 deaths
People from Mureș County
Romanian cardinals
Grand Crosses of the Order of the Star of Romania
Primates of the Romanian Greek Catholic Church
Cardinals created by Pope John Paul II
Pontifical Urban University alumni
Honorary members of the Romanian Academy
Romanian anti-communist clergy
Romanian prisoners and detainees
People detained by the Securitate
Inmates of Sighet prison
Inmates of Râmnicu Sărat prison
Inmates of Pitești prison
20th-century Eastern Catholic archbishops
20th-century Romanian people
21st-century Eastern Catholic archbishops
20th-century cardinals
Eastern Catholic bishops in Romania